The following is a list of players used by each competing nation during the entirety of the 1973 OFC Nations Cup.

Coach:  Barrie Truman

Coach:  Sashi Mahendra Singh

Coach: Freddy Vernaudon

Coach:  Paul Reichert

Coach:  Guy Elmour

External links
https://www.rsssf.org/tables/73oc.html

squads
OFC Nations Cup squads